Yann Samuell (born 7 June 1965) is a French film director and screenwriter.

Life and career
Samuell went to film school and was a storyboard artist before becoming a director. He had  his directing debut in 2003 with Love Me If You Dare.

His second film was the romantic comedy My Sassy Girl (2008). Additional works include L'âge de raison (2010).

Samuell was screenwriter and director of a 2011 adaptation of Louis Pergaud's popular novel, La guerre des boutons. This adaptation is set in the 1960s, with the Algerian War as a backdrop. It is produced by Marc du Pontavice.

An alternate film adaptation of Pergaud's novel was directed by Christophe Barratier as La novelle guerre des boutons (2011), set during World War II in Occupied France. Both films were released in France in September 2011. In the end Yann Samuell's version was a lot more successful and won prizes at international film festvals.

Samuell also directed the film adaption of the Gothic children's novel The Great Ghost Rescue (1975) by Eva Ibbotson. It was released in 2011.

Filmography

References

External links

1965 births
Living people
French film directors
French screenwriters
French-language film directors